The 2005 Tri Nations Series, an annual rugby union competition between the national teams of Australia, New Zealand and South Africa, was the tenth in the series. The competition is organised by SANZAR, a consortium of the three countries' rugby federations. This was the last year in which the Tri Nations was contested in its original double round-robin format, with each team playing the others twice.

New Zealand claimed the title with a 31–27 win over South Africa in the penultimate week of the competition; New Zealand's final opponents, Australia, were already unable to catch them and the result put New Zealand above South Africa with the Springboks having played all their matches. The All Blacks also retained the Bledisloe Cup with victory over Australia in both fixtures. The Mandela Challenge Plate between Australia and South Africa was contested outside the Tri Nations.

Synopsis

The All Blacks were clear favourites going in, having come off a sweep of the British & Irish Lions. The Springboks entered with many questions, most dealing with the player selections made by coach Jake White. Many in South Africa questioned White's selections after a loss to Australia in the first leg of the Mandela Plate. However, the Springboks won the second leg to retain the Mandela Plate. The Wallabies entered with promise, but had been hurt by the loss of talismanic fly-half Stephen Larkham to a shoulder injury before the series.

The series began with the South Africa leg. In the opener, the Springboks came from behind to defeat the Wallabies at Loftus Versfeld. The 22–16 margin gave the Wallabies the consolation of a bonus point. The following week at Newlands, the Boks handed the All Blacks what would prove to be their only loss in 2005 by the identical score.

When the series moved to Australia, the All Blacks ensured themselves of retaining the Bledisloe Cup by a comprehensive 30–13 win over the Wallabies. However, they failed to earn a bonus point. The Springboks kept pace with the All Blacks by nipping Australia the following week 22–19.

The series decider proved to be the first match of the New Zealand leg, pitting the All Blacks and Springboks. In a closely fought match, a late try by Keven Mealamu gave the All Blacks both the win and a key bonus point. They would secure the trophy the next week with a bonus-point win over the Wallabies.

The aftermath

New Zealand
The All Blacks emerged from the Tri Nations as clearly the best team in the world in 2005. They had enough depth to shrug off what would have been a devastating loss to most other national teams—an injury to arguably their best player, fly-half Dan Carter during the win in Sydney, that kept him out of the tests at home against the Springboks and the Wallabies. The All Blacks would punctuate their season with a "Grand Slam" over all four Home Nations on their November tour of the United Kingdom and Ireland. Carter would come back for the Grand Slam tour, and was selected as 2005 World Player of the Year by the International Rugby Board.

South Africa
As for the Springboks, they showed themselves to be a close second to the All Blacks, silencing White's critics in the process. For the second straight year, the Tri Nations was the international coming-out party for a young Springboks star. In 2004, Schalk Burger, Jean de Villiers and Marius Joubert emerged as major stars, with Burger going on to be named the IRB World Player of the Year. This year, Bryan Habana established himself as one of the world's most dangerous wings, and was named a finalist for World Player of the Year.

Australia
The Wallabies fought bravely throughout the series, but were ultimately outmanned. The competition exposed major weaknesses in their front row. They would spiral downward to their longest Test losing streak since 1969, which would cost head coach Eddie Jones his job.

Format
As in past competitions, points were earned on the following schedule:

 4 points for a win
 2 points for a draw
 0 points for a loss
 1 bonus point for scoring 4 tries or more, win or lose
 1 bonus point for a loss by 7 points or less

Table

Results

Round 1

Round 2

Round 3

Round 4

Round 5

Round 6

Statistical leaders
 Leading try scorers:
 Bryan Habana (SA), Doug Howlett (NZ), Joe Rokocoko (NZ) – 3 each
 Leading point scorer:
 Percy Montgomery (SA) – 52

References

External links
 Tri Nations at Rugby.com.au

Tri Nations Series
The Rugby Championship
Tri
Tri
Tri Nations